Echo Echo may refer to:

 Echo Echo (Carbon Leaf album), a Carbon Leaf studio album (2001)
 Echo Echo (IAMX album), an IAMX acoustic album (2020)
 Echo Echo, a character in the Ben 10 media franchise

See also 
 "ECHO, Echo echo"
 Echo (disambiguation)